Places for People (PfP) is a property management, development, regeneration company and leisure company based in the UK.

History
Places for People was founded by North British Housing Association, in 1965. Bristol Churches Housing Association joined the group in 1999, and the name was changed to Places for People Group Ltd on 1 June 2000.

Group companies
Places for People is made of over 20 companies including:

 Places for People Homes, the Group's property management arm responsible for 48000 of the Group's homes across England and Wales
 Places for People Developments, behind a number of developments and long-term regeneration projects, involving master-planning and community consultation;
 Places for People Living+ (formerly Individual Support), a care and support specialist which provides housing and support to older people, those with a disability or mental health problem, women escaping domestic abuse and homeless people; includes Kush, black and minority ethnic specialist in London;
 Places for People Neighborhoods, involved in long term sustainability of PfP neighborhoods  social benefits.
 Places for People Financial Services which offers mortgages, loans, home contents insurance, and budget advice;

Other Group companies include:
 Places for People Capital Markets
 Places for People Landscapes
 Places for People Green Services
 Places for People International
 Cotman Housing Association
 Castle Rock Edinvar
 Chorus 
 Derwent Living 
 Touchstone
 Places for People Leisure 
 Girlings Retirement Rentals
 Allenbuild
 ZeroC
 Residential Management Group (RMG)
 Places for People Scotland
 Places for People Scotland Care and Support

Procurement Hub, a public procurement consortium, is also part of Places for People.

Finances
Housing groups borrow money to pay for new homes and improvements. Like other large housing groups, PfP raises money from investors by issuing corporate bonds in its own name. 

As the late-2000s financial crisis progressed, first-time buyers had difficulty in obtaining bank mortgages. PfP was the first housing group to respond by providing mortgages for shared ownership or 100% buyers on its own developments.

In April 2008, PfP launched the Ownhome equity loan scheme in partnership with the Co-operative Bank. This was aimed at enabling first time buyers, key workers and occupants of social housing to purchase homes on the open market through a combination of a standard cooperative bank mortgage for between 60-80% of the value with the balance funded via an equity loan from Places for People. The scheme ended in April 2010.

In 2010 the group recorded a £25 million impairment in the value of its assets, the largest write-down by a UK housing association up to that date.

PfP raised the social housing sector's first unsecured UK bond in May 2011.

Awards
PfP has won Landlord of the Year twice at Property Week's RESI awards, in 2012 and 2014.

References

External links
Places for People website
Latest inspection report by the Audit Commission, March 2010
 (charitable subsidiary)

1965 establishments in the United Kingdom
Housing associations based in England
Organizations established in 1965
Health clubs in the United Kingdom